The Mixed 4 × 100 metre freestyle relay competition of the 2022 European Aquatics Championships was held on 15 August 2022.

Records
Prior to the competition, the existing world, European and championship records were as follows.

Results

Heats
The heats were started at 10:03.

Final
The final was held at 19:49.

References

Mixed 4 x 100 metre freestyle relay